A fortune teller is someone who practices fortune-telling.

Fortune teller may also refer to:

Film 
 The Fortune Teller (1920 film), 1920 American film directed by Albert Capellani
 The Fortune Teller (1956 film), English title for  I kafetzou, 1956 Greek film directed by Alekos Sakellarios
 Fortune Teller (2009 film), 2009 Chinese documentary directed by Xu Tong
 The Fortune Tellers, alternate title for Ghost Sweepers, a 2012 South Korean film

Music 
 The Fortune Teller (operetta), an operetta in three acts written by Victor Herbert
 Fortune Teller (album), 2008 album by Ira Losco
 "Fortune Teller" (song), a 1962 song written by Allen Toussaint, covered by many artists
 "Fortuneteller" (song), a 1962 song written by Dyer and Basil Hurdon
 "Fortune Teller", a song by Deep Purple from their 1990 album Slaves and Masters
 "Fortune Teller", a song by Sugar from their 1992 album Copper Blue
 "Fortune Teller", a song by Ash from their 1998 album Nu-Clear Sounds
 "Fortune Teller", a song by Fourplay from their 2008 album Energy
 "Fortune Teller", a song by Maroon 5 group from their 2012 album Overexposed
 "Fortune Teller", a song by Calexico from their 2012 album Algiers

Painting 
 The Fortune Teller (Caravaggio), a painting of 1594 by Italian Baroque master Michelangelo Merisi da Caravaggio
 The Fortune Teller (de La Tour painting), a painting of circa 1630 by the French artist Georges de La Tour, depicting a similar subject

Television 
 "Fortune Teller", a live-action episode of The Super Mario Bros. Super Show!
 "The Fortuneteller," an episode of the animated TV series Avatar: The Last Airbender

Other uses 
 Fortune-teller (racehorse), a competitor who failed to complete the 1848 Grand National
 Fortune teller machine
 Paper fortune teller, a type of origami